Peter Muller Scanavino (born February 29, 1980) is an American actor. He currently stars as ADA Dominick "Sonny" Carisi Jr. in the long-running NBC crime/legal drama series Law & Order: Special Victims Unit.

Career
Since 2005, Scanavino has had dozens of minor roles in films and on television, most notably Deception (2008), The Good Wife, and The Blacklist.

In 2005, Scanavino guest-starred on the NBC crime-drama series Law & Order: Criminal Intent in the fifth-season episode "Diamond Dogs" as petty criminal Johnny Feist. He was also a guest on Law & Order as a suspect who was a graphic designer in the 2009 episode "Just A Girl in the World". 

In 2010, Scanavino took some time away from acting to pursue his interest in cooking. After graduating with a certificate in Culinary Arts from The French Culinary Institute in New York, he began a brief stint working in the kitchen of Dan Barber's Michelin-starred restaurant Blue Hill in Greenwich Village. In 2013, Scanavino guest-starred on the long-running NBC crime-drama series Law & Order: Special Victims Unit in Season 14, Episode 13, "Monster's Legacy", as Johnny Dubcek. The same year, he starred in the independent romantic-comedy film Mutual Friends, directed by Matthew Watts.

In 2014, Scanavino joined SVU in its sixteenth season, this time as Dominick Carisi Jr., nicknamed Sonny, a new SVU detective. Initially in a recurring capacity, Scanavino was promoted to the main cast in the fifth episode of the same season. According to SVU Executive Producer Warren Leight, Carisi "come[s] in and shake[s] things up" and is "a guy who maybe needs a little bit of refining." Scanavino noted that Carisi is "a total outsider. He's brusque and he doesn't really get the nuances and he's not very experienced so he puts his foot in his mouth a lot of times. But he's learning. He's picking it up. I think he's a good detective, but he's got a lot to learn on how to approach cases."

Scanavino starred in an episode of Netflix's 2020 anthology series Social Distance as the father of his real-life son Leo Bai-Scanavino.

Personal life
Scanavino is married to painter Lisha Bai, with whom he has three children.

Scanavino briefly studied at Boston University. He is of Italian descent (his grandfather was from Turin).

Scanavino is a fan of the New York Islanders.

Filmography

Film

Television

References

External links
 
 

1980 births
21st-century American male actors
American male film actors
American male television actors
American people of Italian descent
Boston University alumni
Living people
Male actors from Denver